Loryn Locklin (born November 3, 1968) is an American actress. She is best known for Catch Me If You Can and Fortress.

Career
In 1990, Locklin starred in Wes Craven's TV movie Night Visions as psychic criminal profiler Dr. Sally Powers. She starred in the 1993 film Fortress and appeared in Taking Care of Business and Denial, among others. She has also appeared in a few television shows, such as Frasier, JAG and Home Improvement.

Locklin was married to producer/restaurateur Victor Drai from 1990 to 1998; they had a child  in 1993.

Filmography

Films

Television

References

External links 
 

American film actresses
Living people
1968 births
American television actresses
21st-century American women